Calceolaria brachiata is a species of plant in the Calceolariaceae family. It is endemic to Ecuador.

References

Endemic flora of Ecuador
brachiata
Vulnerable plants
Taxonomy articles created by Polbot
Taxa named by Friedrich Wilhelm Ludwig Kraenzlin